The discography of Mika, an English pop singer-songwriter, consists of five studio albums, four live albums, two compilation albums, eight extended plays, thirty-six singles, thirty-one music videos, and four video albums. As of 2017, Mika has sold over 20 million records.

Mika's debut single, "Relax, Take It Easy", was released in the United Kingdom in 2006. The Dodgy Holiday EP was also made available for download. His second single, "Grace Kelly", was released in January 2007 and debuted at number one on the UK Singles Chart, followed by his debut album, Life in Cartoon Motion, in February 2007. Other singles released were "Love Today", "Big Girl (You Are Beautiful)", "Happy Ending", and "Lollipop". Prior to the release of his second album, Mika released a limited-edition EP entitled Songs for Sorrow in June 2009.

Mika's second album, The Boy Who Knew Too Much, followed in September 2009. The first single from the album, "We Are Golden", made its debut at number four in the UK. "Rain" and "Blame It on the Girls" were released as the second and third UK singles with both peaking at number seventy-two. Mika also recorded the title track from the official soundtrack for the 2010 film Kick-Ass.

Albums

Studio albums

Live albums

Compilation albums

Extended plays

Singles

As lead artist

Promotional singles

As featured artist

Other charted songs

Video albums

Music videos

Notes

References
General

 [ "Mika > Discography"]. Allmusic. Retrieved 17 August 2008.

Specific

External links
Official website

Discographies of Lebanese artists
Pop music discographies
Discographies of British artists